Oh Lucy! is a 2017 comedy-drama film directed, produced, and co-written by Atsuko Hirayanagi, based on her 2014 short film of the same name.

The film follows a lonely chain-smoking office drudge living in Tokyo who develops a crush on her English teacher and decides to follow him to Los Angeles when he disappears. However, she ends up in America with her sister and her niece, as well as her English teacher. It premiered in the International Critics' Week section at the 2017 Cannes Film Festival in France, and was released in American theaters on March 2, 2018.

Plot
Setsuko Kawashima is a lonely, chain-smoking office worker in Tokyo who is unmarried. When her niece Mika contacts her, Setsuko goes to see her despite warnings from her sister Ayako, not to get involved. Mika tells Setsuko that she signed up for a year of English classes but can no longer afford to go as she needs to save up money and keep working. Mika asks Setsuko to buy her out and sends her to the school for a free first class.

At the school Setsuko meets John, an American teacher who hugs her warmly, gives her the American name of Lucy and a bright blonde wig so she can adopt an American persona. She meets Takeshi Komori, a classmate in the English class who goes by the name Tom. Setsuko is quickly charmed by John and decides to keep attending classes. At their next session she learns that John has abruptly quit to go back to America. Leaving the school she sees John and Mika kissing and getting into a cab. Her sister informs her that Mika moved to America.

Setsuko tries to return to English class, but finds she can't continue. Instead, when she receives a postcard from Mika with her address, Setsuko decides to follow her. Ayako decides to join her. It is revealed that Lucy holds resentment towards Ayako for marrying her boyfriend.

Arriving in L.A. the two are surprised when they arrive and find only John at home, who claims that Mika left him and he has no idea where she is. After raiding his room, however, Ayako discovers a postcard from Mika sent from San Diego. The sisters hire a car and have John drive them to the motel where Mika was last heard from.

While waiting for Mika to reappear, John offers to teach Setsuko how to drive and the two end up having sex. Afterwards Setsuko goes to a tattoo parlour to get the same tattoo as John but when she shows it to him he rebuffs her.

The following morning Ayako confronts John and tells him to take her to Mika. He goes to his house where he introduces Ayako to his wife and daughter who know where Mika is but will not tell him.

Setsuko, left alone at the motel, ends up running into Mika who tells her that she broke up with John after discovering his family. They have a picnic near the beach where Mika teases Setsuko about having a crush on John, and Setsuko, in retaliation, reveals that she slept with John. Mika jumps off a cliff, trying to commit suicide, but lives.

At the hospital, John asks Setsuko if she told Mika about them. She tells John she loves him but he rejects her completely. Ayako tells her to stay out of their lives.

Setsuko returns to Tokyo where she learns she is essentially being fired. At home she tries to commit suicide by ingesting pills following feeling having lost John, her job, and her family. She is found by Takeshi Komori, who makes her vomit the pills. Takeshi reveals that his son killed himself and that he blames himself for being too strict which is why he enjoys slipping in to his Tom persona. He and Setsuko hug, signifying Setsuko starting over her life anew in finding hope.

Cast
 Shinobu Terajima as Setsuko Kawashima / Lucy, a Tokyo office-worker
 Josh Hartnett as John Woodruff, an English teacher in Tokyo
 Kaho Minami as Ayako Kawashima, Setsuko's sister and Mika's mother
 Shioli Kutsuna as Mika Ogawa, Setsuko's niece who is in a relationship with John
 Kōji Yakusho as Takeshi Komori / Tom, a security consultant taking English lessons
 Megan Mullally as Hannah
 Reiko Aylesworth as Kei, John's wife and Samantha’s mother
 Noelani Dacascos as Samantha, John and Kei's daughter
 Hajime Inoue as Boss, Setsuko's boss
 Miyoko Yamaguchi as Yoshiko
 Suzuka Ohgo as Sakura
 Soseki Yamatoya as Suicide Man
 Miyu Yagyu as Office Lady 1
 Kayano Masuyama as Office Lady 2
 Calvin C. Winbush as Cab Driver
 Nick Gracer as Henry
 Eddie Hassell as Waiter (his final film role before his death on November 1, 2020)
 Todd Giebenhain as Joe, an hotel clerk
 Tre Hale as Tattoo Guy

Production
Hirayanagi worked on the screenplay for the film at the Noe Valley Branch Library after dropping off her kids at school. Cathay Organisation CEO Meileen Choo funded the film. Hirayanagi has said that it cost less than $1 million dollars to make.

Filming concluded in December 2016.

Reception
On review aggregator website Rotten Tomatoes, the film has an approval rating of 98% based on 56 reviews, and an average rating of 7.1/10. The critical consensus is: "Oh Lucy! roots its narrative quirks in universal themes and deep empathy for its characters, all brought to life by strong performances from a talented cast led by the thoroughly charming Shinobu Terajima." On Metacritic, which assigns normalized rating to reviews, the film has a weighted average score of 69 out of 100, based on 18 critics, indicating "generally favorable reviews".

References

External links 

2017 films
2017 comedy-drama films
American independent films
2017 directorial debut films
Films about language
Features based on short films
Films set in California
Films set in Tokyo
Films shot in California
Films shot in Tokyo
2010s Japanese-language films
English-language Japanese films
Midlife crisis films
Gloria Sanchez Productions films
2017 independent films
2010s American films
2010s English-language films
2017 multilingual films
American multilingual films
Japanese multilingual films
Japanese independent films